Sydenham is a suburb of Johannesburg, South Africa. It is located in Region E of the City of Johannesburg Metropolitan Municipality. The suburb is surrounded by the area of Orchards, Orange Grove and other smaller suburbs.

History
The suburb was surveyed for housing in 1905. The suburb's name comes from the name of the farm which originated sometime before the mid-1890s.

References

Johannesburg Region E